Roy Tudor Owen (20 January 1898 – 13 March 1979), known professionally as just Tudor Owen, was a Welsh character actor. Owen is most famous for voicing the role of Towser in the 1961 Disney movie One Hundred and One Dalmatians.

Early life and career
Owen was born on 20 January 1898 in the Welsh town of Penarth, Glamorgan.

After serving with the Royal Army Medical Corps in World War I he went to RADA in London before moving to Hollywood.

He began his career in the 1926 silent film Bride of the Storm as Funeral Harry. His next film role was 22 years later in the 1948 film Up in Central Park.

Owen worked in radio during the 1940s and 1950s, teaming up with producer and director Jack Webb in several programs. The first of those programs was the radio drama Pat Novak, for Hire. He played Novak's drunk ex-doctor friend "Jocko" Madigan.  He played this role from 1946 to 1949. He again co-starred with Webb in the radio series Johnny Modero, Pier 23 in 1947. Owen co-starred with Webb on radio one more time, on the radio version of the Pete Kelly franchise. He played Barney Rickett for the series's summer run in 1951. In 1951, he played the title character's editor in Alias Jane Doe. His last radio appearance was in 1953, leaving behind such radio credits as University Theatre, Escape, Suspense, Family Theater, Lux Radio Theatre, Yours Truly, Johnny Dollar, Crime Classics and The Lone Ranger. Owen also played 'Dusty' in the 1950 episode of The Lone Ranger titled 'Greed for Gold'.

Shortly after Owen's last appearance in radio, he made his first appearance in television on the TV series The Lone Ranger  in 1950. As his presence became wanted more and more in the television field, his presence became less wanted in the film industry. Although he did find success in film it was not as much success as in previous years. His most successful film during this time was in the 1961 Disney animated cartoon One Hundred and One Dalmatians where Owen voiced the role of Towser. His last film role was a background voice role in another Disney cartoon, as a knight in The Sword in the Stone (1963). Some of his other film credits include Montana, The Black Castle, Back to God's Country, Perils of the Jungle, Brigadoon, The Oklahoma Woman, Congo Crossing and Jack the Giant Killer.

Owen's television career expanded during the 1950s and 1960s which included recurring roles in Perry Mason and a starring role in a television series. In 1954–55, Owen co-starred as Joe Ainsley alongside Thomas Mitchell and Kathleen Freeman in the sitcom Mayor of the Town. He retired from show business after a 1965 guest appearance on the television series Voyage to the Bottom of the Sea.

Personal life and death
 
Owen married Gladys Virginia Bennett Paterno in 1953, and they remained together until he died on 13 March 1979 in Los Angeles, California at the age of 81. He is entombed at Forest Lawn Memorial Park in Glendale, California.

Selected filmography

Bride of the Storm (1926) - Funeral Harry
Up in Central Park (1948) - Footman (uncredited)
Fighter Squadron (1948) - Eddie (uncredited)
Life of St. Paul Series (1949) - Dionides
Top o' the Morning (1949) - Cormac Gillespie
Challenge to Lassie (1949) - Doctor (uncredited)
Port of New York (1949) - Apartment Hotel Janitor (uncredited)
The Pilgrimage Play (1949) - Nicodemus
Montana (1950) - Jock
Outside the Wall (1950) - Watchman (uncredited)
The Jackpot (1950) - Police Turnkey (uncredited)
Frenchie (1950) - Toby (uncredited)
Lorna Doone (1951) - Farmer Snowe (uncredited)
Thunder on the Hill (1951) - Old Man (uncredited)
Dick Turpin's Ride (1951) - Mason (uncredited)
Angels in the Outfield (1951) - Father O'Houlihan (uncredited)
The Sea Hornet (1951) - Salvage Company Clerk (uncredited)
Steel Town (1952) - McIntosh (uncredited)
Deadline – U.S.A. (1952) - Watchman (uncredited)
Talk About a Stranger (1952) - Sergeant Magnusson (uncredited)
When in Rome (1952) - Father McGinniss
The World in His Arms (1952) - Old Sailor (uncredited)
Les Misérables (1952) - Citizen (uncredited)
Against All Flags (1952) - Williams
The Black Castle (1952) - Romley
My Cousin Rachel (1952) - Seecombe
Botany Bay (1952) - Warden (uncredited)
Treasure of the Golden Condor (1953) - Fontaine (uncredited)
Perils of the Jungle (1953) - Commissioner
Dangerous When Wet (1953) - Old Salt
Houdini (1953) - Blacksmith (uncredited)
How to Marry a Millionaire (1953) - Mr. Otis (uncredited)
Back to God's Country (1953) - Fitzsimmons
Prince Valiant (1954) - Patriarch (uncredited)
Yankee Pasha (1954) - Elias Derby
Arrow in the Dust (1954) - Tillotson
Brigadoon (1954) - Archie Beaton
The Sea Chase (1955) - Trawler Survivor (uncredited)
The King's Thief (1955) - Simon
The Court Jester (1955) - Friar (uncredited)
The Oklahoma Woman (1956) - Ed Grant
Congo Crossing (1956) - Emile Zorfus
Duel at Apache Wells (1957) - Dr. Munn (uncredited)
The Lonely Man (1957) - Mr. MacGregor (uncredited)
The Story of Mankind (1957) - High Tribunal Clerk
Jet Over the Atlantic (1959) - Mr. Priestwood
North to Alaska (1960) - Purser (uncredited)
One Hundred and One Dalmatians (1961) - Towser (voice)
Frontier Uprising (1961) - Charley Bridger
Most Dangerous Man Alive (1961) - Dr. Meeker
The Notorious Landlady (1962) - Farmer (uncredited)
Jack the Giant Killer (1962) - Chancellor
How the West Was Won (1962) - Parson Alec Harvey (uncredited)
The Sword in the Stone (1963) - Knights / Nobles in Crowd (voice, uncredited) (final film role)

References

External links

1898 births
1979 deaths
Welsh male film actors
Welsh male radio actors
Welsh male television actors
People from Penarth
Royal Army Medical Corps soldiers
British Army personnel of World War I
Alumni of RADA
Welsh emigrants to the United States
Burials at Forest Lawn Memorial Park (Glendale)
British expatriate male actors in the United States
20th-century Welsh male actors